This article lists important figures and events in Malaysian public affairs during the year 1979, together with births and deaths of notable Malaysians and Malaysia-related figures.

Incumbent political figures

Federal level
Yang di-Pertuan Agong:
Sultan Yahya Petra (until 29 March)
Sultan Ahmad Shah (from 29 March)
Raja Permaisuri Agong:
Raja Perempuan Zainab (until 29 March)
Tengku Ampuan Afzan (from 29 March)
Prime Minister: Tun Hussein Onn 
Deputy Prime Minister: Dato' Dr Mahathir Mohamad
Lord President: Mohamed Suffian Mohamed Hashim

State level
 Sultan of Johor: Sultan Ismail
 Sultan of Kedah: Sultan Abdul Halim Muadzam Shah
 Sultan of Kelantan: 
Tengku Ismail Petra (Regent until 29 March)
Sultan Ismail Petra (from 29 March)
 Raja of Perlis: Tuanku Syed Putra
 Sultan of Perak: Sultan Idris Shah II
 Sultan of Pahang: Tengku Abdullah (Regent from 29 March)
 Sultan of Selangor: Sultan Salahuddin Abdul Aziz Shah
 Sultan of Terengganu: 
Sultan Ismail Nasiruddin Shah (until 20 September)
Sultan Mahmud Al-Muktafi Billah Shah (from 20 September)
 Yang di-Pertuan Besar of Negeri Sembilan: Tuanku Jaafar (Deputy Yang di-Pertuan Agong)
 Yang di-Pertua Negeri (Governor) of Penang: Tun Sardon Jubir
 Yang di-Pertua Negeri (Governor) of Malacca: Tun Syed Zahiruddin bin Syed Hassan
 Yang di-Pertua Negeri (Governor) of Sarawak: Tun Abang Muhammad Salahuddin
 Yang di-Pertua Negeri (Governor) of Sabah: Tun Mohd Adnan Robert

Events
January - Go-slow at Subang Airport.
February – Malaysian Industrial Development Authority (MIDA) was established.
29 March – Sultan Yahya Petra ibni Almarhum Sultan Ibrahim Petra of Kelantan and the Yang di-Pertuan Agong died. His body was brought back to Kelantan and laid to rest at Kelantan Royal Mausoleum, Langgar, Kota Bharu.
26 April – Sultan Ahmad Shah of Pahang was elected as the seventh Yang di-Pertuan Agong.
April – Malaysia became the world's largest exporter of semiconductor industry. 
April – Matsushita Electric Industrial Co., Ltd. of Japan opened its factories in Shah Alam, Selangor.
7 May – RTM2 commenced colour television broadcasts.
22 May – The Amanah Saham Nasional Berhad was founded
5 September – Establishment of Sekolah Menengah Sains Sultan Mahmud
September – Opening of the Karak Highway and Genting Sempah Tunnel.

Births
11 January – Siti Nurhaliza – Singer
30 May – Que Haidar – Actor
2 June – Siti Zalina Ahmad – Lawn bowler
30 September – Vince Chong – Reality TV Star
29 October – Maya Karin – Singer and actress
11 November – Farah Asyikin Zulkifli– Singer, songwriter of Malaysian Idol S2 and One in a Million (season 1)

Deaths
8 March – Ibrahim Hj Yaacob – Malayan politician and founder of the Kesatuan Melayu Muda (KMM) (Young Malay Union)
29 March – Sultan Yahya Petra of Kelantan and 6th Yang di-Pertuan Agong
30 March – E. E. C. Thuraisingham – first local Member (Minister) for Education in the Communities Liaison Committee
27 April – Shariff Dol – Malay film actor
18 May – Tun V.T Sambanthan – former MIC president and Minister of Works and Communications
20 September – Panglima Ismail Nasir Shah of Terengganu and 4th Yang di-Pertuan Agong
12 October – V. Manickavasagam – 6th President of the Malaysian Indian Congress (1973-1979)
25 October – Sir Gerald Templer – Former British High Commissioner In King House (1970 - 1975)

See also

 History of Malaysia

References

 
Years of the 20th century in Malaysia
Malaysia
Malaysia
1970s in Malaysia